M. Kozybaev North Kazakhstan University (NKU), in Petropavl, Kazakhstan, was established in 1937 by the Council of People's Commisars of the Kazakh Soviet Socialist Republic as the Petropavlovsk Teachers Training Institute.

 The university enrolled more than 6,000 students in 8 academic departments.

See also
 Education in Kazakhstan
 List of universities in Kazakhstan

External links
 , the university's official website
 The History of North Kazakhstan State University
 :ru:Козыбаев, Манаш Кабашевич: "Manash Kabashevich Kozybaev," biography on Russian Wikipedia.

1937 establishments in the Kazakh Soviet Socialist Republic
Educational institutions established in 1937
Buildings and structures in North Kazakhstan Region
Universities in Kazakhstan
Universities and institutes established in the Soviet Union